Pickwick Hotel may refer to:

Pickwick Hotel (Anaheim, California), listed on the National Register of Historic Places
Another hotel of The Pickwick Corporation